Joanna Jóźwik (born 30 January 1991 in Wałbrzych) is a Polish middle distance runner who specializes in the 800 metres. She won the bronze medal at the 2014 European Athletics Championships. Indoors, at the European Indoor Championships, Jóźwik earned bronze in 2015 and silver in 2021.

She placed fifth at the 2016 Rio Olympics. Jóżwik holds Polish record in the indoor 800 m, and won four national titles over the distance.

Biography
On 16 August 2014, she won the bronze medal in the 800 metres at the European Championships held in Zürich. Her personal outdoor best for this distance is 1:57.37, set in the final of the 2016 Rio Olympics. After placing fifth in that final, Jóźwik controversially declared herself the silver medalist stating, "I'm glad I'm the first European, and the second white." She later apologized for her comments, but insisted she is entitled to her opinion.

Competition record

Personal best

References

External links

 

1991 births
Living people
People from Wałbrzych
Sportspeople from Lower Silesian Voivodeship
Polish female middle-distance runners
European Athletics Championships medalists
World Athletics Championships athletes for Poland
Athletes (track and field) at the 2016 Summer Olympics
Olympic athletes of Poland
Athletes (track and field) at the 2020 Summer Olympics
20th-century Polish women
21st-century Polish women